The Batho Pele Award is an annual South African award given by the Department of Public Service and Administration to a public servant or institution that has demonstrated significant improvements in service delivery. It was first awarded in 2013.

References

External links

South African awards
Awards established in 2013